2017 Fujieda MYFC season.

Squad
As of 15 February 2017.

J3 League

References

External links
 J.League official site

Fujieda MYFC
Fujieda MYFC seasons